Iraklis Larissa, also known by its full name Athlitiki Enosi Iraklis Larissa (Greek: Αθλητική Ένωση Ηρακλής Λάρισας), simply called Iraklis, is a Greek football club based in the city of Larissa. The team currently competes in the Super League Greece 2, the 2nd tier of the Greek football league system.

History

Early years 
Iraklis Larissa was founded in 1930 in the district of Neapoli in Larissa. Its first president was Petros Papakonstantinou. Iraklis was the fifth team of the city to be recognized by the Union Football Association of Thessaly after Pelasgiotida, the Excursion Club, Aris Larissa and Dimitra Larissa (known today as Apollon). They also participated in the first championship of 1930–31. In 1960, Iraklis also became one of the founding members of Union Football Association of Larissa.

On 7 December 1947, Iraklis won 2–1 against Niki Volos and won the Thessalian Cup, thus qualifying for the Greek Cup. They made it to the quarterfinals in which they eventually lost 0–6 against Olympiacos. Iraklis were the first team from Larissa to make it to the round of eight.

In the seasons 1962–63 and 1963–64, Iraklis played in the Beta Ethniki.

Founding of AEL 
After the idea was in the planning since 1958, Iraklis alongside Toxotis Larissa, Aris Larissa and Larisaikos merged in 1964 to form AEL. The newly formed team eventually went on to write Greek football history for being the only team outside the two major cities, Athens and Thessaloniki, to win the championship, as well as winning two Greek cups. Iraklis' president Kostas Tzovaridis became the first president of the newly founded AEL.

Nowadays 
For the next 18 years there was no presence of Iraklis in football. But, Iraklis was re-founded in 1982, after the merge of two neighbouring clubs in: Livadaki A.O. (founded in 1976) and Neapoli A.O.. In 1996, the team made it to the finals of the Greek Football Amateur Cup which they lost 1–2 against Ethnikos Katerini.

After several years of struggle, Lampros Ioakim took over the reigns of Iraklis as president and with his vision led the team to win the 2016–17 Larissa FCA A1 (sixth tier) season. Ioakim put a lot of importance and focus into the development of a youth center in order to develop players that will lead the team in the upcoming years. Having won the 2018–19 Larissa FCA (fifth tier) season, Iraklis returned to the Gamma Ethniki after several decades. The conditions now seem ripe for the return of Iraklis towards professional leagues. The staffing of the sports department with an alloy of experienced and very young and talented football players of the prefecture, are strategic moves that outline the basic principles of the philosophy followed by the young Iraklis. Back to the roots, investing into the local potential and a productive process of highlighting talents through its academies.

Honours

Gamma Ethniki
Group Winners (1): 2021–22
Larissa FCA 
 Winners (3): 1998–99, 1999–00, 2018–19
 Runners-up (1): 2017–18
 Larissa FCA A1
 Winners (1): 2016–17
 Runners-up (1): 2012–13
 Larissa FCA Beta
 Winners (1): 2011–12
 Larissa FCA Gamma
 Winners (1): 2010–11
 Greek Football Amateur Cup
 Runners-up (1): 1995–96
 Larissa FCA Cup
 Winners (1): 1995–96
 Runners-up (6): 1986–87, 1989–90, 1994–95, 1996–97, 1997–98, 2021–22
 Larissa FCA Super Cup
 Winners (1): 2019
Thessaly FCA Cup
 Winners (1): 1946–47

Players

Current squad 
As of 5 August 2022

Out on loan

Notable players

  Kostas Katsaras
  Thomas Makris
  Nikos Goulios
  Ilias Kotsios
  Giannis Valaniadis
  Konstantinos Nebegleras
  Petros Karanastasis
 Vangelis Kotsios

Coaches
 Nikos Vlahoulis
 Giannis Papagiannis
 Christos Andreoudis
 Vangelis Kotsios (2010-2012)
 Thanasis Tsotsos (2012–2013)
 Kostas Kolomitrousis (2013–2014)
 Takis Parafestas (2014)
 Giannis Tsakmakidis (2015–2018)
 Christos Chatziliadis (2018–2022)
 Panagiotis Dilberis (2022–present)

Chairmen
 Giorgos Filippou
 Giorgos Architektonidis
 Thomas Filippou
 Lampros Ioakim (2016–present)

References

Sport in Larissa
Football clubs in Thessaly
Association football clubs established in 1930
1930 establishments in Greece
Gamma Ethniki clubs